Alessandro Politi (July 10, 1679July 23, 1752), was an Italian philologist.

Biography 
Alessandro Politi was born July 10, 1679, at Florence. After studying under the Jesuits, he entered at the age of fifteen the Order of Poor Clerics Regular of the Mother of God of the Pious Schools, and was conspicuous among its members by his rare erudition. He was called upon to teach rhetoric and peripatetic philosophy at Florence in 1700. Barring a period of about three years, during which he was a professor of theology at Genoa (1716–18), he spent the greatest part of his life in his native city, availing himself of the manifold resources he could find there to improve his knowledge of Greek literature, his favorite study. He soon made a name for himself by his careful editions of several little-known Byzantine texts, and in 1733 he was called to the chair of eloquence vacant in the University of Pisa. Accustomed to live among his books aloof from the world, Politi was of an irritable disposition, and sensitive in the extreme to the lightest criticism. He died July 25, 1752.

Works 

 Philosophia Peripatetica, ex mente sancti Thomae (Florence. 1708, 12mo);
 De patria in testamentis condendis potestate, lib. 4 (ibid. 1712, 8vo);
 Eustathii Commentarii in Homeri Iliadem, with notes and Latin version (ibid. 1730-35, 3 vols. fol.);
 Eustathii Commentarii in Dionysium Periegetem, Greek and Latin (Cologne, 1742, 8vo);
 Orationes XII ad Academiam Pisanam (Lucca, 1746, 8vo);
 Martyrologium Romanum castigatum (vol. 1, Florence, 1751, 8vo).

He left many unpublished works. All his orations have been collected (Pisa, 1774, 8vo).

Notes

Bibliography 

 
 

Italian philologists
1679 births
1752 deaths
People from Florence
Academic staff of the University of Pisa
Piarists